Palazzo Corsini may refer to:

Palazzo Corsini, Florence
Palazzo Corsini, Rome

Architectural disambiguation pages